Miodrag Petrović (1 April 1924 – 20 October 2003), known by his stage name Čkalja (Чкаља), was a Serbian actor and one of the most popular comedians of former Yugoslavia.

Biography
He performed in the theatre, where he displayed  a talent for comedy, especially in plays by Branislav Nušić, his favourite author. However, it was the new medium of television that made him famous. From 1959 until the 1980s, he appeared in many TV comedy shows:  Servisna stanica, Dežurna ulica, Spavajte  mirno, Sačulatac, Crni sneg, Ljudi i papagaji, Ljubav na seoski način (in which Silvana Armenulić guest starred), Kamiondžije and Vruć vetar.

Čkalja retired in the late 1980s and spent his last years peacefully. His last public appearance was during the DOS election campaign in 2000 in the overthrow of Slobodan Milošević.

In 2005, a statue of Čkalja was placed in front of his birth house in Kruševac. In 2006, a street in the Zvezdara neighborhood in Belgrade was named after him.

Partial filmography

Jezero (1950) - Crkvenjak
Crveni cvet (1950) - Profa
Četiri kilometra na sat (1958) - Profesor psihologije
Diližansa snova (1960) - Kir Janja (voice, uncredited)
Ljubav i moda (1960) - Komercijalni direktor
Zajednički stan (1960) - Pepi
Nema malih bogova (1964) - Jordan
Sreća u torbi (1961) - Jordan
Put oko sveta (1964) - Jovanče Micić
Na mesto, građanine Pokorni! (1964) - Bora Munja
Orlovi rano lete (1966) - Poljar Lijan
Zlatna praćka (1967) - Sibin
Kad golubovi polete (1968) - Žika Afrika
Višnja na Tašmajdanu (1968) - Profesor francuskog jezika
Bog je umro uzalud (1969) - Predrag & Nenad
Ubistvo na svirep i podmukao način i iz niskih pobuda (1969) - Miodrag Petrović Čkalja (uncredited)
Silom otac (1969) - Jovanče Micić
Lepa parada (1970) - Krojač
Biciklisti (1970) - Jiri
Paja i Jare (1973) - Živadin Jarić 'Jare'
Avanture Borivoja Šurdilovića (1980) - Blagoje Popović 'Firga'
Kamiondžije opet voze (1984) - Živadin Jarić 'Jare'

External links

 

1924 births
2003 deaths
Serbian male actors
Actors from Kruševac